Morse College is one of the fourteen residential colleges at Yale University, built in 1961 and designed by Eero Saarinen.  It is adjacent to Ezra Stiles College and the two colleges share many facilities. The current Head of College is Catherine Panter-Brick.  The Associate Head of College is Mark Eggerman. Blake Trimble is the Dean of Morse College.

History

Samuel Morse was the son of Jedidiah Morse, who opposed the Illuminati in their attempts to subvert Calvinist New England. In his report on the year 1955-56, Yale President A. Whitney Griswold announced his intention to add at least one more residential college to the system Yale had launched only two decades earlier. "We have the colleges so full that community life, discipline, education, even sanitation are suffering," he stated. This news bred wild rumors about four or five new colleges being added to Yale's system. Nothing substantial was announced until the spring of 1959 when Eero Saarinen '34 was chosen as the architect, and the Old York Square behind the Graduate School became the designated site. The Old Dominion Foundation, established by Paul Mellon '29, provided money to build two "radically different" colleges, which would alleviate the growing strain on the older colleges.

Morse College is an eclectic structure built on an odd, angular site with many design features that are reminiscent of Tuscan villages, most notably San Gimignano. The college's original construction consisted almost entirely of single rooms, and in a modern attempt to capture the spirit of Gothic architecture, Saarinen eliminated all right angles from the living areas. (Scully called the design an "anti-Masonic satire in brick and mortar." There are, of course, right angles in every window, between the floors and the walls, and the walls and the ceilings.) This resulted, notoriously, in two rooms which had eleven walls, none of which was long enough to put the bed against and still be able to open the door. In a 1959 article in the Yale Daily News, Eero Saarinen discussed his design for Morse, noting "[o]ur primary effort was to create an architecture which would recognize the individual as individual instead of an anonymous integer in a group." However, right angles have been reintroduced into the architecture of Morse College after renovation in 2010.

The college provides several amenities to its resident "Morsels." The fourteen-story main tower provides an inspiring view of all of New Haven. The college's common areas include air hockey, pool, ping-pong, foosball, and a big-screen TV. A quieter atmosphere is found in Ericka's Room, a space filled with comfy couches, a TV, and board games. Ericka's Room memorializes Ericka Bishop, '97, who was killed by a drunk driver just prior to the start of her junior year in Morse.

Morse has an adjacent "twin" residential college named "Ezra Stiles" which is architecturally similar and was built at the same time. The two distinct colleges share a combined dining hall, over which runs a public walkway to the Payne Whitney Gymnasium. Architecturally, Morse and Stiles differ from their predecessors by having more private space per student, and the lowest ratio of natural light aperture to wall surface of any other colleges.

Morse College freshmen are housed exclusively in the historic Durfee Hall, which, built in 1871, is among the oldest buildings on Yale's Old Campus. It is known for its unique housing quarters, 80% of which are singles—the highest percentage of any freshman housing. Durfee Hall has twelve-foot vaulted ceilings, hardwood floors, at least two fireplaces per suite, and a unique walk-through suite system that allows residents access to all floors and stairwells of the building.  In the 1980s, Morse freshmen lived in Vanderbilt Hall.

Renovations

Morse College was entirely renovated during 2009-2010. The top-to-bottom refurbishment updated the facilities of the college to meet growing student needs while preserving the design and style Morse is known for.

The centerpiece of the renovation project is its new underground recreational spaces, including a theater, music practice rooms, a weaving studio, a recording studio, a digital media room, exercise facilities, and spaces for dance and aerobics. The space joins Morse with neighboring Ezra Stiles College via an underground courtyard spanned by a pedestrian bridge. The former 11,699 square feet of shared social space in Morse and Stiles swelled to 15,300 after the renovations. Pierson and Davenport, by comparison, together have 14,638.

Other completed work at Morse includes an upgrade of all mechanical and electrical facilities, a new roof, new windows, updates to meet fire-safety and handicapped-accessibility codes, and air conditioning for public spaces and the Head of College's suite. Student rooms, common rooms, the gallery, game room, and the buttery have also been upgraded to accommodate the goal of Yale's residential college system as a center for social interaction. There has also been a major reconfiguration of the kitchen and servery that expands the capacity of the dining halls in both Morse and Stiles.

Cheers 
 "Morse, Morse, hung like a horse!"
 "Dot dot, dash dash, we're Morse college, kiss our axe!" (in reference to Morse code and the battle axe that is part of Morse's shield)
 "Dit dot dit, rah rah Morse!"
 "Morse always wins!"

Official cheer
The historical cheer of Morse College is a rendition of "Happy Birthday" to Samuel Morse, followed by the repetition of "Morse, Morse, hung like a horse" six times, then concluding with "Morse Always WINS!"

Notable alumni
 Nancy Caffyn, former Mayor of South Windsor, Connecticut and a former member of the Massachusetts House of Representatives
 Robert Dow (1987), Rhodes scholar and US District Court Judge for the Northern District of Illinois
 Allan Heinberg (1989), co-creator of The OC, writer for The Gilmore Girls, Sex and the City, etc.
 Sada Jacobson, 2004 Olympic bronze and 2008 silver (individual) and bronze (team) medal winner for sabre fencing
 Fran Kranz, actor from "Cabin in the Woods", Dollhouse, and "Death of a Salesman"
 Robert C. Lieberman, political scientist and provost of Johns Hopkins University
 Bronson Pinchot, actor portraying Balki in Perfect Strangers
 Clay Shirky, writer on the social and political impact of the Internet
 Frank Shorter, Olympic gold medalist and famed runner
 Louise Story, New York Times investigative reporter
 Douglas Warner, former Chairman, J.P. Morgan
 Wilhelmina Wright (1986), Associate Justice of the Minnesota Supreme Court
 Allison Williams, actress from Girls
 Jeremiah Quinlan, Yale College Dean of Undergraduate Admissions
 Ben Silbermann, CEO and co-founder of Pintrest
 Kevin Olusola, cellist, beatboxer, saxophonist, songwriter, producer, and singer. Olusola is best known as the beatboxer of the Grammy award-winning vocal band Pentatonix.
 Jennifer Beals, actress and Golden Globe Award nominee.

Trivia
 The Morse courtyard was home to two well known sculptures - Lipstick (Ascending) on Caterpillar Tracks by Claes Oldenburg and a piece by J. Seward Johnson. The Johnson sculpture was removed during the renovations.
 Morse's mascot is the walrus, because in French le morse translates to walrus.
 A student in Morse is known as a "Morsel," also the name of the small cafe ("Buttery") in Morse's common room.
 Durfee Hall was featured in Gilmore Girls.
 Morse College won the Yale College Freshman Olympics in 2012 and 2013.

References

External links
 Morse College website

Residential colleges of Yale University
University and college dormitories in the United States
Eero Saarinen structures
Modernist architecture in Connecticut